The 2021 KPMG Women's PGA Championship was the 67th Women's PGA Championship, played June 24–27 at Atlanta Athletic Club in Johns Creek, Georgia. Known as the LPGA Championship through 2014, it was the third of five major championships on the LPGA Tour during the 2021 season.

The championship was won by Nelly Korda with an aggregate of 269, which was a tournament record tying to-par total of 19 under. She finished three strokes ahead of runner-up Lizette Salas, and a further six strokes ahead of Kim Hyo-joo and Giulia Molinaro, who tied for third place.

Round summaries

First round
Thursday, June 24, 2021

Second round
Friday, June 25, 2021

After the second round, the leading 70 players made the cut, which fell at 146 (2 over par).

Third round
Saturday, June 26, 2021

Final round
Sunday, June 27, 2021

References

External links

Coverage on the LPGA Tour official site

Women's PGA Championship
Golf in Georgia (U.S. state)
PGA Championship
Women's PGA Championship
Women's PGA Championship
Women's PGA Championship